Balin is Marty Balin's 1981 debut solo album.  Two top-40 singles were released, "Hearts" (a U.S. #8 hit, and also his biggest as a solo artist) and "Atlanta Lady (Something About Your Love)" (U.S. #27). The album rose to #35 on the Billboard charts.

Track listing

Side one
"Hearts" (Jesse Barish) – 4:32
"You Left Your Mark on Me" (Terry Turrell, Eric J. Burgeson) – 4:40
"Lydia!" (Rick Nowels, Marty Balin) – 3:36
"Atlanta Lady" (Barish) – 3:46

Side two
"Spotlight" (Turrell, Burgeson) – 3:30
"I Do Believe in You" (Richard Page, John Lang, Steve George, Jerry Manfredi) – 3:23
"Elvis and Marilyn" (Leon Russell, Kim Fowley, Dyan Diamond) – 3:05
"Tell Me More" (Obren Bokich, John Whitney) – 3:48
"Music Is the Light" (Barish) – 4:17

CD releases

Balin was released by American Beat on CD in 2008 and by EMI in 2009. Both editions featured the shorter, single version of "Hearts" rather than the longer album version.

In March 2013 BGO reissued the album along with the follow up release Lucky on one CD. Mastered by Andrew Thompson the BGO edition is the only CD version that features the full-length album version of "Hearts".

In 2020, A&M alongside Universal Music Japan re-released the title as a part of the AOR Light Mellow 1000 series.

Charts

Singles

Personnel 
 Marty Balin – lead vocals, acoustic guitar
 Mark Cummings – pianos, synthesizers, vocoder, backing vocals
 Johnny De Caro – guitars, backing vocals
 Richard Bassil – bass, backing vocals
 Billy Lee Lewis – drums, percussion, backing vocals

Additional Personnel 
 Michael Boddicker – vocoder (2)
 John Jarvis – acoustic piano (4, 6)
 Neil Larsen – electric piano (9), synthesizers (9)
 John Hug – guitars, string arrangements and conductor 
 Ken Watson – cymbalum (1)
 Bobbye Hall – percussion
 Steve Forman – percussion
 Harry Bluestone – concertmaster
 Frank De Caro – contractor
 Bill Champlin – backing vocals (1)
 Rick Nowels – backing vocals
 David E. Landau – backing vocals

Production 
 A Great Pyramid Ltd. Production.
 John Hug – producer
 Tom Flye – engineer
 Clif Jones – assistant engineer
 Ann Fry – assistant engineer
 David E. Landau – production coordinator
 Joe Buchwald – chief executive, manager
 Recorded at The Village Recorders, (Los Angeles) and The Record Plant (Sausalito).
 Mixed at The Record Plant
 "Elvis and Marilyn" recorded at White Rabbit Studios (Sausalito).
 Mastered at Sterling Sound (New York City).
 Greg Calbi – mastering
 Bill Burks – art direction
 Richard Avedon – Marty Balin photography
 Tom Gibson – other photography

References

1981 debut albums
Marty Balin albums
EMI America Records albums